Sagar Lok Sabha constituency is one of the 29 Lok Sabha constituencies in the Indian state of Madhya Pradesh. This constituency has been reserved for the candidates belonging to the Scheduled Castes since 1967. It covers parts of Sagar and Vidisha districts.

Assembly segments
Presently, Sagar Lok Sabha constituency comprises the following eight Vidhan Sabha (Legislative Assembly) segments:

Members of Parliament

Election results

See also
 Sagar district
 List of Constituencies of the Lok Sabha

References

Lok Sabha constituencies in Madhya Pradesh
Sagar district